Island of Living Puke is the fifth studio album by Zoogz Rift, released in 1986 by SST Records.

Track listing

Reception 
Keyboard Magazine, in a special "Experimental Music" issue, described The Island of Living Puke as "moments of outstanding free-form rock, sandwiched between scrupulously obscene interruptions."

Personnel 
Adapted from the Island of Living Puke liner notes.
 Zoogz Rift – vocals, guitar, production

Musicians
 Scott Colby – slide guitar
 Alan Eugster – keyboards
 Richie Hass – drums
 Henry Kaiser – guitar (A5, B3, B4)
 Willie Lapin – bass guitar
 Ed O'Bryan – bass guitar

Musicians (cont.)
 Aaron Rift – piano (A1)
 Jonathan "Mako" Sharkey – clavinet
 Craig Unkrich – keyboards
Production and additional personnel
 Ethan James – engineering

Release history

References

External links 
 Island of Living Puke at iTunes
 Island of Living Puke at Discogs (list of releases)

1986 albums
SST Records albums
Zoogz Rift albums